Antonio Camillo Pesci (died 1521) was a Roman Catholic prelate who served as Bishop of Muro Lucano (1517–1521).

Biography
On 23 December 1517, Antonio Camillo Pesci was appointed during the papacy of Pope Leo X as Bishop of Muro Lucano.
He served as Bishop of Muro Lucano until his death in 1521.

References

External links and additional sources
 (for Chronology of Bishops) 
 (for Chronology of Bishops) 

15th-century Italian Roman Catholic bishops
Bishops appointed by Pope Leo X
1521 deaths